Clarence Clifton "Cliff" Young (November 7, 1922 – April 3, 2016), known as C. Clifton Young, was a United States congressman from Nevada.

A Republican, Young was elected to the U.S. House of Representatives from the state's at-large district in 1952 and re-elected in 1954. He won the Republican nomination for the United States Senate in 1956 but was defeated by incumbent Democrat Alan Bible in a close race.

Young later served in the Nevada Senate, from 1966 to 1980, and on the Nevada Supreme Court from 1985 to 2002, including a stint as chief justice (1989–1990). He also served as president of the National Wildlife Federation (1981–1983). Young died in Reno, Nevada in 2016 at the age of 93.

In 1988, the Federal Building and U.S. Courthouse in Reno, Nevada was renamed for Young.

Notes

External links

 A Guide to the C. Clifton Young (family) Papers, Special Collections, University Libraries, University of Nevada, Reno.
 A Guide to the C. Clifton Young (political) Papers, Special Collections, University Libraries, University of Nevada, Reno.

1922 births
2016 deaths
20th-century American judges
20th-century American politicians
United States Army personnel of World War II
Harvard Law School alumni
Military personnel from Nevada
Republican Party Nevada state senators
Justices of the Nevada Supreme Court
People from Lovelock, Nevada
Politicians from Reno, Nevada
United States Army officers
University of Nevada, Reno alumni
Republican Party members of the United States House of Representatives from Nevada
Chief Justices of the Nevada Supreme Court